The Xiangxiang dialect is a dialect of Xiang Chinese, spoken in Xiangxiang, Hunan province, China. It is part of a group of dialects called the Central Xiang dialects.

Geographic distribution
The linguistic maps below are derived from the Digital Language Atlas of China, which is derived from the Language Atlas of China, the first atlas to comprehensively catalog and chart the distribution of Chinese dialects. This atlas refers to the two main dialects in Xiangxiang City and its surroundings as Changyi  and Loushao.

The division of Xiang into New Xiang and Old Xiang was introduced by Yuan Jiahua, but has been superseded by the Language Atlas of China classifications.

The Language Atlas of China serves as the starting point for many efforts to further detail, map and classify Xiang dialects, including the many studies of Bao Houxing and Chen Hui.

History and strategic value
The Xiang dialect group forms a transitional zone between northern and southern Chinese dialects.

Prehistorically, the main inhabitants were Ba, Nanman, Baiyue and other tribes whose languages cannot be studied. During the Warring States Period, large numbers of Chu migrated into Hunan. Their language blended with that of the original natives to produce a new dialect Nanchu (Southern Chu). The culture of Xiangxiang at the center of Hunan is considered to be mainly Chu. The language of Shaoshan, Loudi, Shuangfeng and Xiangxiang (Old Xiang) is considered as originating from a synthesis of Chu and the languages of original natives.

Migrations into Hunan can be divided into three periods . Before the Five Dynasties and Ten Kingdoms period, migrants came mainly from the North. Between the Five Dynasties and Ten Kingdoms period and the Ming dynasty, migrants came mainly from Jiangxi. In the early Ming dynasty, large numbers of migrants came from Jiangxi and settled in present day Yueyang, Changsha, Zhuzhou, Xiangtan, and Hengyang districts. Migrants from Jiangxi concentrated mainly in southeastern Hunan and present day Shaoyang and Xinhua districts. They came for two reasons: the first is that Jiangxi became too crowded and its people sought expansion. The second is that Hunan suffered greatly during the Mongol conquest of the Song dynasty, when there was mass slaughter, and needed to replenish its population. After the middle of the Ming dynasty, migration gradually became more diverse and economically and commercially motivated. Migrants who came from the North settled mainly in northern Hunan followed by western Hunan. For this reason northern and western Hunan are Mandarin districts.

Phonology

Comparison with Standard Chinese

General
These phonetic charts use IPA phonetic symbols with the addition of curly-tail alveolo-palatal symbols and follow the format set forth by Chao.

Consonants

Tones
Phonemically, Xiangxiang dialect has seven tones.

Jinsou Town

Consonants

Yueshan Town

Tones

See also
 Xiang Chinese
 List of Chinese dialects

References

Bibliography

Categories

 
Culture in Hunan
Languages of China
Subject–verb–object languages
Subgroups of the Han Chinese